This is a list of National Hockey League (NHL) players who went undrafted in the NHL Entry Draft (i.e. they were draft eligible but were not selected during the course of the draft and later signed with NHL teams as an undrafted free agent) and played in at least 100 NHL regular season games. Players whose professional careers began before the 1969–70 season who were not drafted are not considered to be undrafted for purposes of this article, owing to NHL sponsorship of major junior hockey existing prior to that season. 

Also not included in this list is Wayne Gretzky, who was one of the Edmonton Oilers priority selections when they entered the NHL in 1979 and thus was never eligible to be drafted by an NHL team. Under existing rules he would have been removed from the Oilers and placed into the NHL Entry Draft since no team held his NHL rights, but the Oilers were allowed to keep Gretzky as one of their priority selections and were forced to choose last in each round of the 1979 NHL Entry Draft as further compensation.

Key
 Inducted into the Hockey Hall of Fame
 Appeared in an NHL game during the most recently completed season

Statistics are complete to the end of the 2021–22 NHL season and show each player's career regular season totals in the NHL.

Goaltenders

Skaters

See also

Notes

References

Undrafted
National Hockey League Entry Draft